Noah Sewell (born April 26, 2002) is an American football linebacker. A native of American Samoa, he and his family moved to Utah in 2012 before playing college football at Oregon, where he was named the Pac-12 Defensive Freshman of the Year in 2020. Sewell is the younger brother of NFL player Penei Sewell.

Early years
Sewell was born in Malaeimi, a village near Pago Pago, the capital of American Samoa. He would begin playing American football alongside his three brothers as a child after his father Gabriel became a coach of the sport. Seeing the potential for his children to make it to the National Football League (NFL), Gabriel moved his family to St. George, Utah in 2012. There, he attended Desert Hills High School before transferring to Orem High School in Orem, Utah.

During his high school career he had 224 tackles, 8.5 sacks and five interceptions as a linebacker and 2,316 yards and 40 touchdowns as a running back. He was named the Utah Valley Football Player of the Year as a senior in 2019. A five-star recruit, Sewell committed to the University of Oregon to play college football. His brother, Penei, was drafted by the Detroit Lions seventh overall in the 2021 NFL Draft. Two other brothers, Nephi and Gabriel, also play college football.

College career
Sewell was named the Pac-12 Freshman Defensive Player of the Year in 2020.

References

External links
Oregon Ducks bio

Living people
Players of American football from American Samoa
Players of American football from Utah
American football linebackers
Oregon Ducks football players
People from Western District, American Samoa
American sportspeople of Samoan descent
2002 births